(r)Evolution is the ninth studio album by Swedish heavy metal band HammerFall. It was released on 27 August 2014 in Sweden, 29 August in mainland Europe, 1 September in the UK, and 2 September in North America. For the first time since 1998, HammerFall collaborated with Fredrik Nordström on a studio album, and Fredrik is sharing production credits with guitarists Oscar Dronjak and Pontus Norgren. It is also the band's final album to feature drummer Anders Johansson before his departure in September 2014. On 4 September 2014 (r)Evolution went all the way to No. 1 on Sverigetopplistan (Swedish Charts).

Track listing

Personnel 
 Joacim Cans – lead and backing vocals
 Oscar Dronjak – guitars, keyboards, backing vocals
 Pontus Norgren – guitars, backing vocals
 Fredrik Larsson – bass, backing vocals
 Anders Johansson – drums
 James Michael – vocals on track 6
 Mats Leven – backing vocals

Production 
 Oscar Dronjak – production
 Pontus Norgren – production
 Fredrik Nordström – production
 James Michael – production

Charts

References

External links
 Official HammerFall website
 HammerFall To Release '(r)Evolution' Album
 HammerFall - (r)Evolution

2014 albums
HammerFall albums
Nuclear Blast albums
Albums produced by Fredrik Nordström